The Shatila refugee camp, also known as the Chatila refugee camp, is a settlement originally set up for Palestinian refugees in 1949. It is located in southern Beirut, Lebanon and houses more than 9,842 registered Palestine refugees. Since the eruption of the Syrian Civil War, the refugee camp has received a large number of Syrian refugees. In 2014, the camp's population was estimated to be between 10,000 and 22,000.

History

Establishment
Shatila was set up by the International Committee of the Red Cross to accommodate hundreds of refugees who came there after 1948. They were from villages around the area of Amka, Majd al-Krum and Yajur in northern Palestine.

During Lebanese Civil War
The Sabra and Shatila massacre was the slaughter of between 762 and 3,500 civilians, mostly Palestinians and Lebanese Shiites, by the Hobeika-led militia and the IDF in the Sabra neighborhood of southern Beirut and the nearby Shatila refugee camp from approximately 6:00 pm on 16 September to 8:00 am on 18 September 1982.

During Syrian Civil War

Since the eruption of the Syrian Civil War in 2011, Lebanon's population has swelled by more than 1 million Syrian refugees. The camp has also swollen with Syrian refugees, receiving mostly the poor Syrians. As of 2014, the camp's population is estimated to be from 10,000 to 22,000.

Management

The camp comprises approximately one square kilometer and thus has an exceptionally high population density.

UNRWA operates one health center and two primary schools within the camp. Non-governmental organizations active in the camp include Al-Najda, Beit Atfal Al-Soumoud, Norwegian Peoples' Aid, Doctors Without Borders, the Palestinian Red Crescent Society and the Association Najdeh.

See also
 Naji al-Ali

References

External links

 Lebanon - Camp Profiles - Shatila
 Windward between Naples and Baghdad
 Are Knudsen and S. Hanafi (Eds.) Palestinian Refugees: Identity, Space and Place in the Levant. Routledge. 2010

Populated places established in 1949
Palestinian refugee camps in Lebanon
Syrian refugee camps
Articles containing video clips
1949 establishments in Lebanon